Evacuation is a British children's reality television series presented by Matt Baker which was broadcast on CBBC between September 2006 and February 2008 where six boys and six girls from across the United Kingdom experienced living as evacuees in World War II.

Format
The children lived exactly as wartime evacuees would have: they ate meals, attended school, wore clothes, were given haircuts, and were punished for misbehavior as was customary during the 1940s. In the first episode of both series, the children had to hand over all of their 21st century items (e.g. mobile phones), which were returned at the end of the series. They were also given gas masks and ID cards, which were carried at all times. The children engaged in traditional wartime activities, such as building air-raid shelters. When they were not being filmed, the adults continued to stay in character to maintain the illusion that the scenario was real.

Series one
The first series of Evacuation began transmission on CBBC on BBC One on 4 September 2006. The children were evacuated to the fictitious Castle Farm, where they experienced living as children who were evacuated to a traditional wartime farm.

Series two
The second series, known as Evacuation to the Manor House, began transmission on CBBC on BBC One on 17 January 2008. The children were evacuated to the fictitious Pradoe Hall, where they experienced living as children who were evacuated to a traditional 1940s manor house.

List of Children & Characters
Children, Series 1:
 Luke Burton
 Josh Opoku
 Harry Cracknell
 Richard Hall
 Charlie McCutcheon
 Felix Chancellor-Burton 
 Natalie Travers (appeared only in the first three episodes; left due to homesickness)
 Laura Adegoke
 Natalie Hancock
 Tia Hatton
 Joanna Lau
 Chelsea Thompson

Characters, Series 1:
 Mr. and Mrs. Rivett, who own the farm (were later referred to as 'Uncle Brian' and 'Aunty Sue' with increased familiarity)
 Miss Young, the school teacher
 Mr. Storey, the local ARP Warden
 Mr. Patrick, an elderly gentleman who works for Mr. Rivett as a farmhand
 Mr. Graham, the local air-raid shelter expert
 Miss Victoria, a member of the Women's Land Army
 Matthew, the ploughman
 Private Pickard, a Home Guardsman
 The local vicar, never named on-screen

Children, Series 2:
Nishith "Nish" Hegde
Sean Williams
Jack Smith
Samir "Sam" Sayah
Scott Dunstan
Daniel Rushton
Shaaron Somasanduram
Olivia Barry
Rachel Hardy
Mary Ellen Jones
Jade Hitchmough
Annabella Jacobs
Sade Philpotts (arrived later in the series; only appeared in the final four episodes)

Characters, Series 2:
 Lord and Lady Olstead, who own the manor house
 Miss Young, the school teacher
 Mr. Henderson, the butler
 Mrs. Dobinson, the housekeeper
 Cook, never named on-screen
 Mr. Goodall, the gamekeeper
 Miss Victoria, the kitchen hand
 Nurse Durkin
 Colonel Fanthorpe, of the Home Guard
 Mr. Lewis, the ARP Warden
 Mr. Jackson, the Fire Warden
 Mr. Pugh, the shepherd
 Mr. Ward, the farmer
 Sergeant Rae
Helen drs wife Wendy Richardson
lady debbie Debbie Hunter

Notes
 To maintain the illusion that the characters were real people, the closing credits never named the actors who played the characters.
 Evacuation is a reality television show, meaning that there is no continuity between the two series; therefore the fact that Miss Young appears to be teaching at both Castle Farm and Pradoe Hall is irrelevant.
 Although it is a reality television show, all the 1940s characters in the series are portrayed by role-playing actors, who were always referred to by their character's name.

Episodes
List of Evacuation episodes

External links

2006 British television series debuts
2008 British television series endings
2000s British children's television series
BBC children's television shows
English-language television shows
British reality television series
Historical reality television series
Television series by Warner Bros. Television Studios